Paul Cézanne: Portrait of My World is a 1996 interactive CD-ROM developed by Corbis, allowing players to explore the life and work of Paul Cézanne. It was one of a series of six art-themed games released by Corbis, alongside titles like A Passion for Art: Renoir, Cezanne, Matisse, and Dr. Barnes, Volcanoes: Life on the Edge, and Critical Mass: America's Race to Build the Atomic Bomb.

Development
The game was announced in December 1995.

References

1996 video games
Educational video games
Classic Mac OS games
Video games developed in the United States
Windows games